Sorry, I Love You is a 2014 Chinese romantic drama film directed by Larry Yang. It was released in China on January 3, 2014.

Plot 
With a bullet lodged in his head that no doctor could remove, Walker's only got 6 months to live-so he packs up and leaves Canada to venture back to China and find his biological family.

Cast
Vivian Dawson
Swan Wen 
Wang Ji 
Wu Yujuan 
Wesley Wong
Jade Lin

Reception
The film earned ¥2.79 million at the Chinese box office.

References

2014 romantic drama films
Chinese romantic drama films